Rhopaloscelis is a genus of longhorn beetles of the subfamily Lamiinae, containing the following species:

 Rhopaloscelis maculatus Bates, 1877
 Rhopaloscelis schurmanni Breuning, 1969
 Rhopaloscelis unifasciatus Blessig, 1873

Size: average 2.5mm

References

Desmiphorini